Chaval, civil name Yvan Francis Le Louarn (* 10 February 1915 in Bordeaux; † 22 January 1968 by suicide in Paris), was a French caricaturist and cartoonist. German editions of his oeuvre were mostly published by Diogenes Verlag.

Career 
 Painters schools
 School of Fine Arts, Bordeaux
 Ecole des Beaux-Arts de Paris

Oeuvre

Books

Work in newspapers 
His cartoons were also published in:
 Paris Match
 Le Figaro
 Le Rire
 Punch et 
 Le Bordelais

Book illustrations 
He illustrated the following books:
 Swift 
INSTRUCTIONS AUX DOMESTIQUES & Opuscules Humoristiques
 Erich Kästner 
Die Schule der Diktatoren
 Raymond Queneau
 Perrot, mon ami
 Denise Haraari
 Slawomir Mrozek
Das Leben für Fortgeschrittene,
Das Leben für Anfänger

Films 
 Conte médiocre
 Les oiseaux sont des cons

Awards 
 Prix Carrizey
 Coupe Internationale du Meilleur Dessinateur

Exhibitions 
 Japan
 USA
 Paris
 Germany

Personal 
Chaval's political opinions are seen controversially in France.

References

External links 
 
 

20th-century French painters
20th-century French male artists
French male painters
Painters who committed suicide
French cartoonists
French caricaturists
French satirists
French comics artists
French male artists
1915 births
Artists from Bordeaux
1968 deaths
1968 suicides
Suicides in France